Gua sha, or kerokan (in Indonesia), is a traditional Chinese medicine (TCM) practice in which a tool is used to scrape people's skin in order to produce light petechiae. Practitioners believe that gua sha releases unhealthy bodily matter from blood stasis within sore, tired, stiff, or injured muscle areas to stimulate new oxygenated blood flow to the areas, thus promoting metabolic cell repair, regeneration, healing, and recovery.

Gua sha is sometimes referred to as "scraping", "spooning" or "coining" by English speakers. The treatment has also been known by the French name, tribo-effleurage. Gua sha has no known health benefits and can have adverse effects, some of them potentially serious.

Etymology 
Gua sha, the literal translation being "to scrape petechia" which refers to the sand-like bruising after the treatment, spread from China to Vietnam, where it became very popular. It is known as cạo gió, which roughly means "to scrape wind", as in Vietnamese culture "catching a cold" or fever is often referred to as trúng gió, "to catch wind". The origin of this term is the Shang Han Lun, a c. 220 CE Chinese medical text on illness caused by cold. As in most Asian countries, China's medical sciences were a profound influence in Vietnam, especially between the 5th and 7th centuries CE. Cạo gió is an extremely common remedy in Vietnam and for expatriate Vietnamese.

Technique 

Gua sha involves repeated pressed strokes over lubricated skin with a smooth-edged, blunt instrument. Skin is typically lubricated with massage oil or balm, and commonly a ceramic Chinese soup spoon was used, or a blunt, well-worn coin, even honed animal bones, water buffalo horn, or jade, or even a simple metal cap with a blunt rounded edge is used.

In cases of fatigue from heavy manual labor work, a piece of ginger root soaked in rice wine is sometimes used to rub down the spine from top to bottom.

The smooth edge is placed against the oiled skin surface, pressed down firmly, and then moved down the muscles—hence the term tribo-effleurage (i.e., friction-stroking)—or along the pathway of the acupuncture meridians, along the surface of the skin, with each stroke being about 4–6 inches long.

Practitioners tend to follow the tradition they were taught to obtain sha: typically using either gua sha or fire cupping. The techniques are sometimes used together. In China, both gua sha and fire cupping are widely available in institutions ranging from national and public hospitals to private massage shops. Due to local peoples' deep trust in Traditional Chinese medicine and the treatments' reasonable price, both are very popular.

Effectiveness 
Gua sha's effectiveness is not backed up by sound clinical evidence. In use, it nearly always damages the skin. Negative side effects of gua sha range from minor ones – including dermatitis, burns and blood in the urine – to rare major ones including bleeding in the brain and severe injuries requiring skin grafts.

The use of hospital standards of sterilization and personal protective equipment is important to prevent contamination of infectious pathogens. Although no cases of blood-borne pathogens have been reported, the risk of transmission of blood cells and fluids cannot be ruled out, as with all contact producers. Protective measurements against infectious agents that are recommended include the single use of disposable devices, sterilization of re-used equipment, and glove use. Lubricants should be poured out into cups and they are to be disposed of after each use. Devices that cannot be adequately sterilized such as horn and bone are not recommended.

Cross-cultural confusion with physical abuse 
A slightly different form of gua sha using the edges of coins rather than porcelain items is practiced as a folk medicine technique. Individuals practice this "coining" amongst their own family members in many Asian countries, such as Vietnam, or in Cambodia, and also in their respective emigrant communities abroad. Health care practitioners in hospitals in Orange County, California, routinely see evidence of coining among hospitalized Vietnamese patients. The clinical fact sheet calls it Cao gio (sounds like "gow sah") it's literal meaning is 'scrape the wind'.

In 1980, it was found that many Vietnamese still distrusted U.S. medical practitioners in part due to fear of being accused of child abuse. "This practice has been misidentified as child abuse in case reports," despite the intention of the parents. However, physicians are required by law to report injuries from remedies such as "coining" to the appropriate agency (e.g., state child-protective service or state adult-protective service), regardless of intention.

In popular culture 
The 2001 movie The Gua Sha Treatment was made in Hong Kong and showed gua sha. It is a story about cultural conflicts experienced by a Chinese family in the United States.

In 2021 and 2022, the practice went viral on TikTok.

See also 
 Graston Technique

References

Traditional Chinese medicine
Massage therapy
Alternative medicine
Alternative medical treatments
Pseudoscience